José Daniel Di Leo (born 2 January 1961) is an Argentine football manager and former player who played as a defender. He is the current assistant manager of San Lorenzo.

References

External links

1961 births
Living people
Footballers from Rosario, Santa Fe
Argentine footballers
Association football defenders
Argentine Primera División players
Rosario Central footballers
Talleres de Córdoba footballers
Club Atlético Colón footballers
Argentine football managers
Argentine Primera División managers
San Lorenzo de Almagro managers